Fagopyrum cymosum, also known as tall buckwheat, is a domesticated plant used in traditional Chinese medicine, for animal feed, and as an ornamental plant. It is native to much of China, and to Bhutan, Nepal, India, Burma, and Vietnam.

Chemistry
The flowers are known for their high content of fagopyrin, a naphthodianthrone that provokes phototoxic effects known as fagopyrism.

References

cymosum
Cereals
Crops originating from Asia
Flora of Asia
Pseudocereals